"Escape (The Piña Colada Song)" is a song written and performed by British-American singer-songwriter Rupert Holmes taken from his fifth studio album Partners in Crime (1979). As the lead single for the album, the pop song was recommended by Billboard for radio broadcasters on September 29, 1979, then added to prominent US radio playlists during October–November. Rising in popularity, the song peaked at the end of December to become the final US number-one song of the 1970s.

Content
The song speaks, in three verses and three choruses, of a man who is bored with his current relationship because it has become routine and he desires some variety. One day, he reads the personal advertisements in the newspaper and spots an ad that catches his attention: a woman seeking a man who, among other little things, must like piña coladas (hence it being known as "the piña colada song"). Intrigued, he takes out an ad in reply and arranges to meet the woman "at a bar called O'Malley's", only to find upon the meeting that the woman is actually his current partner. The song ends on an upbeat note, showing the two lovers realized they have more in common than they had suspected and that they do not have to look any further than each other for what they seek in a relationship.

Background and writing
Recorded for Holmes's Partners in Crime (1979) album, the song came from an unused track for which Holmes wrote temporary or "dummy" lyrics. This version, "The Law of the Jungle", was released as part of his Cast of Characters (2005) box set and was inspired by a want-ad he read whilst idly scanning the personals one day. As Holmes put it, "I thought, ‘what would happen to me if I answered this ad?’ I'd go and see if it was my own wife who was bored with me." The title of the song was originally going to be "People Need Other People", and was later to be revealed that it was a true story.

The chorus originally started with "If you like Humphrey Bogart", which Holmes changed at the last minute, replacing the actor with the name of the first exotic cocktail that came to mind and fit the music.

Holmes said in 2019 that he still does not drink piña coladas.

Reception and legacy
The song shot up through the US charts, becoming the country's last number-one Billboard Hot 100 hit of 1979 and of the 1970s.  "Escape" was knocked out of the top spot but returned to number one on the Billboard Hot 100 chart during the second week of 1980, having been displaced for a week by KC and the Sunshine Band's "Please Don't Go".  It was the first pop song to ascend to #1 on the Billboard pop chart in two different decades. The song was the US's 11th-best-selling single of 1980 on the Billboard Hot 100.

Credits and personnel
Rupert Holmes – vocals, keyboards, synthesizer
Dean Bailin – guitar
Frank Gravis – bass
Leo Adamian – drums
Steve Jordan – "double drumming" with Adamian

Charts

Weekly charts

Year-end charts

All-time charts

Certifications

See also
List of Billboard Hot 100 number-one singles of 1979
List of Billboard Hot 100 number-one singles of 1980

References

1979 songs
1979 singles
Billboard Hot 100 number-one singles
Cashbox number-one singles
RPM Top Singles number-one singles
Songs about alcohol
Songs about infidelity
Rupert Holmes songs
Songs written by Rupert Holmes
Infinity Records singles
Song recordings produced by Jim Boyer (audio engineer)